Xbx or variation may refer to:

Places
 Ta' Xbiex, Malta, postal code: XBX
 Bernay–St Martin Airport, an airport in France, IATA code: XBX

Other uses
 XBX, Ten Basic Exercises, one of the Royal Canadian Air Force Exercise Plans
 Kabixí language, a spurious language, ISO 639 language code: xbx

See also
 
 Xbox (disambiguation)
 BX (disambiguation)
 XB (disambiguation)
 IEEE 802.1xbx MAC Security Key Agreement protocol, an IEEE 802.1 standard
 Martin B-10 (formerly XB-10), a 1930s American bomber